Murchison County was one of the counties of New Zealand on the South Island.

During the period 1853 to 1876, the area that would become Murchison County was administered as part of Nelson Province. On 1 April 1909 the Murchison County Act 1908 came into force, creating the Murchison County out of what had been the Hampden Riding of Inangahua County.  The county council's administrative headquarters was located in Murchison.

Murchison County existed until the 1989 local government reforms, when the Tasman District was formed through the amalgamation of the Murchison County, Golden Bay County, Waimea County and Richmond Borough administrative areas.

References

Counties of New Zealand
Tasman District